General elections were held in the Faroe Islands on 31 August 2019. The elections resulted in the defeat of Aksel V. Johannesen's coalition government consisting of the Social Democrats, Republic, and Progress. Following the elections, a new coalition government was formed by Union Party leader Bárður á Steig Nielsen, consisting of the Union Party, the People's Party and the Centre Party, which won 17 of the 33 seats.

According to political scientist Lise Lyck, the main election issues were public finances (welfare, taxes and public coffers), recent reforms of the fishing sector and same-sex marriage.

Electoral system
Seats were allocated using the d'Hondt method.

Results

References

Elections in the Faroe Islands
Faroes
General
Faroes